Un Jour d'été is a 2004 album recorded by French-born singer Amel Bent, released on 2005. It was her debut album and was successful on the charts (#3 in France), even allowed Bent to gain a Victoire de la Musique in the category 'Revelation of the year'. There were three singles from the albums, all of them being top ten hits in France : "Ma Philosophie", "Le Droit à l'erreur" and "Ne retiens pas tes larmes".

Track listing
 "Je Suis" (Charbonnel, Devier, Gallerne) – 3:18
 "Ma Philosophie" (Bent, Georgiades, Mackichan) – 3:23
 "Le Temps passe" (Bent, D.R., Gallerne, Milan) – 3:14
 "Le Droit à l'erreur" (D.R., Molondo, Welgryn) – 4:01
 "Mes Racines" (Bent, D.R., Kabala) – 3:38
 "Ne retiens pas tes larmes" (D.R., Sitbon) – 3:43
 "Pardonnez-moi" (D.R., James, Westrich) – 4:46
 "J'attends" (D.R., Dufour, Welgryn) – 3:39
 "Quand elle chante" (Bent, D.R., Farley, Mahy) – 3:59
 "Auprès des miens" (Charbonnel, Devier, Gallerne) – 3:26
 "Partis trop tôt" (featuring Kery James) (Foks, James) – 4:10
 "Je me sens vivre" (D.R., Godebama, Kabala, Ngung) – 3:23
 "Ne retiens pas tes larmes" (piano voix) (D.R., Sitbon) – 3:54

Personnel
Adapted from AllMusic.

 Jean-Marc Apap – Strings
 Isabelle Baleanu – assistant
 Jean-Marc Benaïs – Guitar
 Amel Bent – adaptation, choeurs, primary artist
 Melissa Bent – choeurs
 Jean-François Berger – Clavier, Fender Rhodes, Programming, Realization
 Vincent Creusot – assistant
 Jean Yves d'Angelo – fender rhodes, piano
 G.M. Farley & The Great Wear Family – composer
 Matthias Froidefond – assistant
 Kéry James – primary artist, realization
 Jean-marc lubrano – Photography
 Blair Mackichan – composer
 Anthony Marciano – musical direction
 Laure Milan – choeurs
 Christophe Morin – strings
 Lyonel Schmit – string arrangements, strings
 Franck Sitbon – arranger, piano
 Laurent Vernerey – basse
 Volodia – arranger, clavier, engineer, mixing, programming, realization, vocal director

Charts

Certifications

Release history

References

2005 albums
Amel Bent albums
European Border Breakers Award-winning albums